Better Days is the debut album by American blues artist Susan Tedeschi, originally released in 1995 under the name Susan Tedeschi Band, but later re-released in 1998 after she found national success with Just Won't Burn.

Track listing
"It's up to You" (Lamond, Tedeschi) – 4:19
"Gonna Write Him a Letter" (Tedeschi) – 3:05
"Love Never Treats Me Right" (Tedeschi) – 2:11
"It Hurts Me Too" (James) – 5:04
"Locomotive" (Tedeschi) – 4:28
"You're on My Hair" [instrumental] (Tedeschi) – 4:12
"Better Days" (Hayes) – 6:40
"Hound Dog" (Jerry Leiber, Mike Stoller) – 4:03
"I Don't Want Nobody" (Robey) – 2:58
"Ain't Nobody's Business" (Grainger, Robbins) – 7:33

Personnel 
Susan Tedeschi – guitar, rhythm guitar, vocals
Adrienne Hayes – guitar, rhythm guitar, slide guitar
Jim Lamond – bass
Mike Aiello - drums
Annie Raines – harmonica

Production
Susan Tedeschi (producer)
Rik Tinory (audio engineer)

References

Susan Tedeschi albums
1995 debut albums